Major Decisions: Taking Charge of Your College Education, published in 2010, is a self-help book written by Henry J. Eyring. The intended purpose of the book is to help both current and prospective college students get the most out of their college experience. “Probably the most important thing I’ve learned about higher education is this: you can get everything you hope for—and more—if you take personal responsibility for the design and construction of your education. The key is to be your own ‘general contractor,’ the one who puts all of the pieces of a higher education together according to a careful personal plan.”

Eyring is the 17th president of Brigham Young University–Idaho.

General Contractor's Rules
The second half of the book features seven rules that each student/prospective student should follow as they seek to become the general contractor of their own education.

 Rule #1: Always Have a Career Dream
 Rule #2: Always Have a Major
 Rule #3: Customize Your Degree
 Rule #4: Find the Best Teachers
 Rule #5: Do Your Best Work
 Rule #6: Connect Your Degree to What Comes Next
 Rule #7: Get All the HSJ Skills You Can

Royalties
Eyring donates all the royalties from his books to the Perpetual Education Fund.

References

External links
Official Major Decisions Twitter Account
What Is Personal Development?
Deseret Book

2010 non-fiction books
Self-help books
Personal development
Deseret Book books